Onneyn Morris Tahi (24 July 1944 – 1998) was a Vanuatuan politician.

Biography 
Tahi was born on 24 July 1944 in the small town of Losingoiburie on Aoba Island. Shortly thereafter, he moved to his father's village Lovuietu, where his father owned a shop, bakery, and copra processing shed. He attended the Tavolala Village School, the Holy Trinity School, and the Aobabalu School.

After some years in civil service, Tahi entered politics in 1979 when he ran for and won a seat on the Aoba Islands Subcommittee. He represented Ambae constituency in Parliament from 1980 to 1995. In 1993, he was given the ministerial portfolio of education and sports. Tahi was the speaker of the Parliament from 1987 to 1991. He briefly served as acting president of Vanuatu in January 1991 after Ati George Sokomanu was removed from Office by the Electoral College due to gross misconduct. Tahi was named Minister of Agriculture in 1991. He began to see some opposition due to a perceived failure to initiate projects in his constituency. He was Minister of Finance in 1992.

In 1994, he was one of the founding members of the People's Democratic Party. He returned to the Vanua'aku Pati in 1997. In the lead up to the 1998 parliamentary elections, Tahi was killed in a car crash.

References

1944 births
1998 deaths
Presidents of Vanuatu
Speakers of the Parliament of Vanuatu
Members of the Parliament of Vanuatu
Finance Ministers of Vanuatu
Vanua'aku Pati politicians